The Byram Marl is a geologic formation in Mississippi. It preserves fossils dating back to the Paleogene period.

See also

 List of fossiliferous stratigraphic units in Mississippi
 Paleontology in Mississippi

References
 

Paleogene Mississippi
Paleogene Louisiana